The Faerie Wars Chronicles is a fantasy action young adult novel series written by James Herbert Brennan. The first book in the series, Faerie Wars was published in the United Kingdom in February 2003 by Bloomsbury Publishing. As of 2011, there are five books in the ongoing series.

Bloomsbury began releasing the series in the United States under its Bloomsbury USA imprint in April 2003. In January 2007, Macmillan Publishers began republishing the series in the United States under its Tor Books imprint. On January 16, 2005, the first novel in the series, Faerie Wars reached number 4 on the New York Times best seller list for paperback children's books.

Characters

Demons
 Beleth is the Prince of Darkness, ruler of the Realm of Hael. He is a dangerous entity. In Ruler of the Realm, Beleth forces Blue to form a marriage pact with him so that he could rule the Faeries of the Light and Haelkind with Blue. Due to the pact, Blue becomes Queen of Hael. Immediately after the pact, she kills Beleth.

Faeries of the Light
 Princess Holly Blue has a curious nature. She uses a psychotronic spider to go on mind trips anywhere she wants. She occasionally wears boy's clothes to disguise herself when she plays the role of detective to find information. She meets Henry when he walks on her bathing in the Purple Palace. In The Purple Emperor, she is declared by her brother, Prince Pyrgus Malvae, Queen of Faerie and Purple Empress. She later becomes Queen of Hael (Hell) as well after her pact with Beleth, the Demon Prince. At the end of Faerie Lord, Blue accepts Henry's proposal to marry her.
 Prince Pyrgus Malvae is the animal-loving crown prince, heir to the Peacock Throne. He has an uncanny knack of getting into trouble. In Faerie Wars, he is in trouble for leaving home without the Purple Emperor's permission and for stealing Lord Hairstreak's phoenix. He is also being sought by the demonologist Brimstone who needs him as a human sacrifice. In The Purple Emperor, he meets Nymphalis, one of the Forest Faeries, whom he marries at the beginning of Faerie Lord.
 Apatura Iris is the Purple Emperor and the father of Holly, Pyrgus and Comma. He dies in Faerie Wars and is resurrected as a zombie in The Purple Emperor.
 Prince Comma is half-brother to Pyrgus and Blue. He has a mischievous nature and is often in trouble with his father. In The Purple Emperor, he becomes the Purple Emperor, with Lord Hairstreak as regent, when his resurrected father signed a contract for Comma to take his place as the Purple Emperor. In Faerie Lord, he becomes Acting Emperor while Blue searches for Henry.
 The Painted Lady (Madam Cynthia Cardui) is a mysterious old lady, who only adheres to rules and protocols when it suits her. She is one of Queen Blue's most experienced spies and is the Head of the Imperial Secret Services. She shows romantic interest in Mr. Fogarty and is the only person to call him "Alan". In Faerie Lord, it is revealed that she and Alan have married each other.

Faeries of the Night
 Lord Black Hairstreak is the antagonist of the story.  He is determined to be in control of the Faerie Realm using any possible means. He is also uncle to Comma, as his mother was Hairstreak's sister, but not to Blue and Pyrgus as their mother died and Apatura Iris remarried.
 Silas Brimstone is a demonologist, necromancer and co-owner of Chalkhill and Brimstone Glue Factory. In Faerie Lord, he became insane after he summons Jormungand.
 Jasper Chalkhill is the wealthy co-owner of Chalkhill and Brimstone Glue Factory with Silas. At the end of Faerie Wars, he is imprisoned for using cats to make glue. In The Purple Emperor, Lord Hairstreak illegally releases Chalkhill from jail for his own schemes.

Forest Faeries
Cleopatra Antiopa is the Queen of the Forest Faeries and mother of Nymphalis.
Nymphalis Antiopa is the agile princess of the Forest Faeries. She meets Pyrgus in The Purple Emperor when he is exiled into the forest by Comma. She later marries Pyrgus at the beginning of Faerie Lord. She is more commonly known as Nymph.

Humans
 Henry Atherton, an English teenager, is the protagonist of the story. At the end of Faerie Wars, he is promoted to the title of Knight Commander of the Grey Dagger and given a faerie name of Iron Prominent by Pyrgus. At the end of Faerie Lord, Henry proposes to marry Blue, to which she accepts.
 Alan Fogarty is a stubborn old man, a former physicist with a talent for engineering and is an anarchist. He is a former bank robber, which is one of the causes of his paranoia about the CIA and FBI, which he believes are after him. He assists Henry and Pyrgus in making an inter-world portal between the Faerie world and the human world in Faerie Wars. At the end of Faerie Wars, he is promoted to Gatekeeper of the House Iris in recognition of the help he gave Pyrgus. In The Purple Emperor, he meets the Painted Lady for the first time and is romantically interested in her from then on. In Ruler of the Realm, he becomes Acting Emperor for a month due to Blue's absence. In Faerie Lord, it is revealed that he and Cynthia have married each other. Soon afterwards, he dies due to Temporal Fever.

Media

Book releases

Audiobook
On September 30, 2004, Recorded Books released an 11-hour-25-minute audio book version of Faerie Wars which was read by Gerald Doyle. On September 1, 2005, a 12-hour, 30-minute audio book version of The Purple Emperor, which was read by Gerald Doyle, was released by Recorded Books. In 2006, a 12-hour, 15-minute audio book version of Ruler of the Realm, which was read by  James Daniel Wilson was released by Recorded Books. In 2008, Faerie Lord was adapted into a 12-hour, 15-minute audiobook narrated by James Daniel Wilson and was released by Recorded Books.

Reception
The New York Times commends Brennan as "a master of the hairpin turn, leading readers in one direction and suddenly reversing their expectations . . . Brennan excels at maintaining suspense.”

Sponsored by The Young Adult Library Services Association, teen readers from the various YA Galley Groups selected Faerie Wars as the Teens' Top Ten book for 2003. School Library Journal stated that Faerie Wars has a "complex plot with plenty of drama and action". However, it criticised Faerie Wars for "sinking under its own weight". Nathan Brazil from SF Site commends Faerie Wars for plot that alternates between "provoking and serious" and " funny, fast paced adventure". He also comments on the lack of depth in the story. Nicholas Tucker from The Independent compares Faerie Wars to Harry Potter for its inventiveness and to Gormenghast for its dark themes. He also commends the Brennan for avoiding "unlimited melodrama in contemporary writing [which] often ends up choking on its own rhetoric" by "infusing his story with affectionate irony as characters are brought down to earth by humour". Kirkus Reviews comments that Faerie Wars is the "perfect choice for Harry Potter fans who don't know what to read next, aside from unjustifiably archaic gender roles."

Carolyn Cushman reviewing for Locus commented that The Purple Emperor "lacks the novelty of the first volume, but the fast-paced adventure and numerous quirky characters keep things lively." Kirkus Reviews comments on The Purple Emperor that "Brennan cuts chapters off sharply, maintaining heated suspense, but the ultra-quick pinballing between threads is sometimes frustrating." The review also comments on the "gross-out factor" with "verbose worms [which] are implanted in people's butts and speak to them inside their brains."

Kirkus Reviews on the Ruler of the Realm criticises "Brennan's characters for seem younger than their ages and his prose is often cluttered". However, "images are colorful, and the ricocheting narrative--each chapter ending in suspense and the next chapter jumping to a different plotline--pulls readers to a surprisingly satisfying conclusion."

Kirkus Reviews on the Faerie Lord criticises the novel for its "disturbing definition of female sexiness just tops off this queen (Blue)'s notably passive and love-focused role, and may well outweigh Brennan's sweet touches and lovely final revelations."

Oisín McGann, writing for the Inis Magazine, praises The Faeman Quest for having "a fast pace, a light-hearted tone and rich descriptive passages." However, it criticised the novel for having "a few key scenes...which seemed to happen while the reader isn’t looking."

References

External links
Official Faerie Wars website

2003 British novels
British fantasy novels
Fantasy novel series
Bloomsbury Publishing books